Sar Bast (also known as Qal‘eh-ye Bāsakūn and Sar Bas) is a village in Hamaijan Rural District, Hamaijan District, Sepidan County, Fars Province, Iran. At the 2006 census, its population was 789, in 197 families.

References 

Populated places in Sepidan County